Michael, Mick or Mike Price may refer to:

Michael F. Price (1951–2022),  American value investor and fund manager
Michael P. Price (born 1938), American theatre producer and artistic director
Michael Price (composer), English film and TV composer
Michael Price (cricketer) (born 1981), South African cricketer
Michael Price (footballer, born 1982), Welsh football player
Michael Price (footballer, born 1983), English football player
Michael Price (sculptor) (1940–2001), American sculptor
Michael Price (writer), American television writer and producer
Mick Price (footballer) (1914–1973), Australian rules footballer
Mick Price (snooker player) (born 1966), retired English professional snooker player
Mike Price (born 1946), American college football coach
Mike Price (basketball) (born 1948), retired guard
Mike Price (jazz trumpeter), American jazz trumpeter and composer